Two Men and a Widow (Swedish: Två man om en änka) is a 1933 Swedish comedy film directed by John Lindlöf and starring Gösta Ekman, Gull-Maj Norin and Tollie Zellman. It was shot at the Råsunda Studios in Stockholm. The film's sets were designed by the art director Arne Åkermark.

Cast
 Gösta Ekman as 39 Ludwig Karlsson
 Martin Öhman as Öhman
 Tollie Zellman as 	Emilia Lundvall
 Gull-Maj Norin as Karin Lundvall
 Bengt Djurberg as 	Paul Rosencrona
 Thor Modéen as Manager Ström
 Åke Ohberg as 	Harry Garpman
 Maritta Marke as 	Elsa
 Ilse-Nore Tromm as 	Märy
 Anna-Lisa Baude as 	Stina
 Jullan Jonsson as 	Johanna
 Ulwa Wiman as 	Viola
 Wiktor Andersson as 	Sheet-metal worker

References

Bibliography 
 Freiburg, Jeanne Ellen. Regulatory Bodies: Gendered Visions of the State in German and Swedish Cinema. University of Minnesota, 1994.

External links 
 

1933 films
Swedish comedy films
1933 comedy films
1930s Swedish-language films
Films directed by John Lindlöf
Swedish black-and-white films
Swedish films based on plays
1930s Swedish films